This is a list of the National Register of Historic Places listings in Washington County, Texas.

This is intended to be a complete list of properties and districts listed on the National Register of Historic Places in Washington County, Texas. There are six districts and 61 individual properties listed on the National Register in the county. Twenty-seven individually listed properties are Recorded Texas Historic Landmarks while five districts contain many more.

Current listings

The locations of National Register properties and districts may be seen in a Google mapping service provided.

|}

See also

National Register of Historic Places listings in Texas
Recorded Texas Historic Landmarks in Washington County

References

External links

Registered Historic Places

Buildings and structures in Washington County, Texas
Washington